For When It Rains is a 20,000 limited edition VHS by the band Type O Negative, which was released in 1994 as an add-on to the Bloody Kisses digi-pack.

Track listing
All songs written by Peter Steele.
"Christian Woman"
Edit with alternate lyrics
"Black No.1 (Little Miss Scare-All)"
Edit

Personnel
 Peter Steele – bass guitar, lead vocals
 Kenny Hickey – guitar, backing vocals, co-lead vocals on "Black No.1 (Little Miss Scare-All)"
 Josh Silver – keyboards, backing vocals
 Sal Abruscato – drums

References
  http://www.angelfire.com/mi/type38/disc.html
  https://web.archive.org/web/20100426001550/http://www.netexpress.net/~zombie/ton/rain.htm
  http://metal-archives.com/release.php?id=173615

1994 video albums
Type O Negative video albums
Music video compilation albums
1994 compilation albums